Hugh Fraser, 1st Baron Fraser of Allander (15 January 1903 – 6 November 1966), was the grandson of Hugh Fraser I, and the father of Sir Hugh Fraser, 2nd Baronet. He inherited his father's shop and built it into the large retail chain now known as House of Fraser.

Career
Born in Partick, Lanarkshire (now in Glasgow), Hugh Fraser was educated at Glasgow Academy and Warriston School near Moffat. In 1919 he joined his father's business, a shop in Buchanan Street in Glasgow.  He became Managing Director in 1924 and Chairman on his father's death in 1927. He expanded the business by acquisition buying department stores throughout Scotland as well as the John Barker Group and Harrods in England and Argentina. In 1948 he established Scottish & Universal Investments ('SUITS') to acquire non-retail businesses including the Glasgow Herald.

In 1945 he purchased Mugdock Castle from The 6th Duke of Montrose. He was created a baronet, styled "of Dineiddwg in the County of Stirling", in 1961, and was subsequently created The 1st Baron Fraser of Allander, of Dineiddwg in the County of Stirling, in 1964.

He died in 1966 at "Dineiddwg", his home at Mugdock.

Family
In 1931, he married Kathleen Hutcheon and together they went on to have one son and one daughter.

Arms

References

1903 births
1966 deaths
Hugh Fraser, 1st Baron Fraser of Allander
Fraser, Hugh, 1st
People educated at Warriston School
People educated at the Glasgow Academy
20th-century Scottish businesspeople
The Herald (Glasgow) people
Businesspeople from Glasgow
Hereditary barons created by Elizabeth II